The Hellmut Seibt Memorial is an international figure skating competition. Named after Austrian figure skater Hellmut Seibt, the event is generally held in February in Vienna, Austria. Medals may be awarded in men's singles, ladies' singles, and pairs on the senior, junior, and advanced novice levels.

Senior medalists

Men

Ladies

Pairs

Junior medalists

Men

Ladies

Advanced novice medalists

Men

Ladies

References

External links 
 Hellmut Seibt Memorial at EKE Vienna

Figure skating competitions
International figure skating competitions hosted by Austria